Sean Altman (born May 9, 1961) is an American musician and songwriter. He is a founder and former lead singer (tenor) of the a capella musical group Rockapella and a pioneer of the modern a cappella movement. He was a member of Rockapella from its inception in 1986 until he left the group in 1997 to launch a solo career.

As a founding member of Rockapella, Altman is best remembered for his role on the PBS children's geography game show Where in the World Is Carmen Sandiego?, as the band served as the house vocal band and comedy troupe. Altman and his childhood friend David Yazbek co-wrote the show's theme song, which is recognized as one of the best-known television themes in history. Rockapella released seven albums in Japan and two in the United States during Altman's eleven-year tenure.

As a subsequent solo artist, Altman has released four solo albums on the independent Chow Fun Records: seanDEMOnium (1997), alt.mania (2002), Losing Streak (2005), and SALT (2018). In 2016 Altman and singer-songwriter Jack Skuller formed The Everly Set, an acclaimed tribute to The Everly Brothers, and in 2020 the duo formed the tribute act Forever Simon & Garfunkel. Both acts tour nationally and have released CD compilation albums. Altman's comedy song act Sean Altman's JEWMONGOUS has released two solo comedy song albums — Taller Than Jesus and The Least Jewy Jew In Jewville — about which The Washington Post wrote "Witty and outrageously lampooning ... full of catchy melodies, clever arrangements and lyrics that yield satiric gems." His a cappella group The GrooveBarbers has released three albums: Glory (2005), Guts (2010), and Warning: Barbershop (2014), and his defunct comedy song duo What I Like About Jew released the album Unorthodox (2005) before its breakup in 2006. In 2017 Altman and singer-songwriter Patti Rothberg released an album of their original songs entitled "Dragon Meets Phoenix". Altman wrote and recorded "Save The Ocean" and "You Ought To Be Saving Water" (with ex-Rockapella members Barry Carl and Elliott Kerman) for the popular Schoolhouse Rock! series, and has composed songs for the TV shows "Where In The World Is Carmen Sandiego?" (PBS), "Where In Time Is Carmen Sandiego?" (PBS), "Out Of The Box" (DISNEY), "The Book Of Pooh" (DISNEY), "The Damn Show", "Brickleberry", Science Mission 101, and the feature film "Teddy P. Brains".

Early life
Altman grew up in the Riverdale neighborhood of the Bronx, New York.  His musical talent was recognized early on, as he starred in school musicals (Pippin, Bye Bye Birdie, Gypsy) and claims to have charmed female classmates with "hallway serenades". At age seventeen Altman turned pro, performing on the New York City nightclub circuit with David Yazbek as Moon Pudding, a Simon & Garfunkel-styled teen duo. At Brown University, Altman majored in political science, but focused primarily on singing college a cappella with The High Jinks and fronting Blind Dates, his new wave rock group that released two national college radio hits, "Don't" b/w "Hold On" and "Radio" b/w "Second Hand". Altman continued with Blind Dates after graduating from Brown in 1984, moving from Providence to New York City in search of a record deal which never materialized. The group dissolved in 1987, just as Rockapella's career began.

Rockapella years

After graduating from Brown together, Altman and fellow High Jinks member Elliott Kerman joined classmates Steve Keyes and David Stix to form a new a cappella group called Rockapella. Rockapella began its career humbly, performing on the New York City corner of West 74th Street and Columbus Avenue in front of a Haagen Daz ice cream parlor. The group's first repertoire consisted of barbershop arrangements, a cappella renditions of classic doo-wop pieces, and R&B soul arrangements lifted from their idols, The Persuasions. As the group grew in experience and Altman honed his vocal arranging skills, they began to focus less on oldies and barbershop, and more on contemporary rock music. A dinner party performance for television personality Kathie Lee Gifford led to the group's 1988 appearance on the ABC TV show Live with Regis and Kathie Lee.  Rockapella's performance of Altman's signature arrangement of the calypso novelty standard "Zombie Jamboree" caught the eye of writer-producer Gerard Brown, who invited Rockapella to perform on the PBS Great Performances TV special Spike Lee & Company – Do it A Capella, which featured established a cappella acts Take 6, Ladysmith Black Mambazo and Rockapella's idols The Persuasions. Elektra Records released Rockapella's live recording of "Zombie Jamboree" as the single from the Spike & Co. — Do It A Cappella soundtrack album, and the group's recording career was launched.

Producers of the PBS Kids game show in production Where in the World Is Carmen Sandiego? took note of Rockapella's talents on "Spike" and signed the group to appear as the show's comic troupe and vocal house band. The half-hour game show aired daily for five years and 295 episodes, catapulting Rockapella into television celebrity, turning the group from a club act into a nationally touring concert powerhouse, and making the Rockapella-performed theme song (penned by Sean and his childhood friend David Yazbek) into one of the best known and most popular television themes in history. Altman is particularly remembered for his trademark blonde braids, which were ceremoniously sheared in the last episode of the fifth and final season by the show's host Greg Lee. The soundtrack to the show features five of Altman's original songs, including the theme song and a duet with The Persuasions on "My Home". A sequel album co-produced by Altman, with collaborators Billy Straus and David Yazbek, was entitled Carmen Sandiego: Out Of This World and contained four Altman compositions as well as contributions from the rock bands XTC and They Might Be Giants. Carmen Sandiego aired for five seasons (1991-1995) during which Rockapella released two independent albums in the United States: Primer and Lucky Seven. Simultaneously, Rockapella enjoyed a parallel career in Japan, releasing eight studio albums containing 14 Altman originals. During Altman's tenure Rockapella toured Japan eight times, performing dozens of sold-out concerts in theaters, and appearing on many Japanese TV variety specials.

Solo career
Altman left Rockapella in April 1997 to focus on his burgeoning solo career as a singer-songwriter. He promptly released his debut CD, seanDEMOnium, about which the Philadelphia Daily News wrote: "Imagine Dion meeting Marshall Crenshaw at the Beatles' house, with the Kinks, Beach Boys, Four Seasons and Persuasions all dropping by for a song swap. The words have a cynical edge, but what really grabs you is the old-fashioned sweetness and punch of his neo-doowop vocals playing off incredibly hook-happy tunes." After releasing seanDEMOnium, Altman assembled a backup band, played New York City rock clubs for two years, garnering accolades for his live shows. The Village Voice called him "an absurdly talented performer... a power-pop mensch and an aspiring teen cult leader." He released alt.mania, his second CD of original music in 2002, about which Hits magazine wrote: "This record rocks....Rockapella mastermind, internet entrepreneur and divorcé Altman tells barbed, musically diverse tales of romantic misadventures....A dark, funny, resilient, postmodern concept album about love and loss."

Altman is the only three-time winner of the Contemporary A Cappella Society's "Original Song of the Year" award, and has also been a "Best Male Vocalist" award recipient. He currently records and performs a cappella with some other ex-Rockapella members in The GrooveBarbers (featured as The Astelins in TV commercials for Astelin nasal spray), bittersweet pop songs as a solo artist, and comedy songs in Jewmongous. He has vocal-arranged and produced a cappella albums for the groups Minimum Wage and Kol Zimra.  Altman was named "Best Male Artist" in the 2005 International Acoustic Music Awards and was a 2005 Kerrville New Folk finalist. He is a member of The Loser's Lounge tribute series in New York and serenades hospital patients as a volunteer with Musicians On Call. In June 2011, Altman released the song "MOT: Members of The Tribe" with Jordan B. Gorfinkel. The song highlights the contrasts in different observance levels within Judaism. It promotes tolerance and respect.

Personal life

In 2003, Altman married operatic soprano Inna Dukach. They live in Harlem, New York City. They have a daughter named Ruby, who was born in November 2008.

Solo discography

CDs

Guest appearances/various releases

References

External links

JEWMONGOUS
The GrooveBarbers
Rockapella
Inna Dukach

1961 births
Living people
American tenors
American male pop singers
American rock singers
Brown University alumni
Jewish American musicians
A cappella musical groups
Entertainers from the Bronx
Musicians from New York City
Rockapella members
People from Harlem
21st-century American Jews